Dool is one of the largest villages, located in Kishtwar district of Jammu and Kashmir, India. The village is divided into two wards namely Dool A and Dool B with total 874 householders living. Its district headquarters are pinpointed in Kishtwar and sub-district administrative units are located in "Kishtwar tehsil" which is situated on the banks of Chenab River.

Demographics
According to the 2011 census of India, Dool has 874 households. The literacy rate of Dool village was 62.69% compared to 67.16% of Jammu and Kashmir. In Dool, Male literacy stands at 77.15% while the female literacy rate was 42.75%.

References 

Villages in Kishtwar district